Petrove is an urban-type settlement in Oleksandriia Raion of Kirovohrad Oblast (region) of Ukraine. It hosts the administration of Petrove settlement hromada, one of the hromadas of Ukraine. Population: .

Petrove is situated midway between Kropyvnytskyi and Dnipro cities on the bank of the Inhulets River. 

Petrove is a populated place of Petrove town council, which is a municipal community and beside the town also includes three neighboring villages.

History 
It was a village in Kherson Governorate of the Russian Empire.

In January 1989 the population was 9844 people. 

In January 2013 the population was 7530 people.

Until 18 July 2020, Petrove was the administrative center of  Petrove Raion. The raion was abolished in July 2020 as part of the administrative reform of Ukraine, which reduced the number of raions of Kirovohrad Oblast to four. The area of Petrove Raion was merged into Oleksandriia Raion.

See also
 FC Inhulets Petrove

References

Urban-type settlements in Oleksandriia Raion